Fran Scott is a science presenter best known for her work on CBBC's Absolute Genius with Dick and Dom. She is the Clothworkers' Science Content Producer at the Royal Institution.

Radio and television
Scott is a science presenter on Children's BBC, where she has presented How to Be Epic at Everything and the BAFTA-nominated Absolute Genius with Dick and Dom. She has also presented and appeared as a judge on Newsround. 

Scott has presented two BAFTA-nominated programmes for BBC2, The Imagineers and You Too Can Be An Absolute Genius. She co-presented Factomania for BBC Knowledge and has featured as science presenter on Channel 4's Sunday Brunch. Scott has presented How Dangerous Is Your...? for BBC Radio 4 Extra. In 2018, she became a judge on Channel 4's Lego Masters.

In 2019, Scott appeared on Massive Engineering Mistakes for the Discovery Channel.

Stage
Scott has presented science stage productions for several years, sharing a stage with Professor Robert Winston, Richard Hammond and Professor Brian Cox, among others. Her stage production company, Great Scott! Productions has been commissioned by Google for Education, CBBC and Siemens.

Awards
 RTS 2013: Best Learning or Education Programme

References

Year of birth missing (living people)
Living people
British television presenters
Lego people